This is a list of games for the OS/2 operating system.

List

Angband
AVARICE: The Final Saga
B.U.G.S 
Battle for Wesnoth
Crown of Might
Doom
Entrepreneur
Freeciv
Galactic Civilizations
Hopkins FBI
Lemmings/Oh No! More Lemmings/Christmas Lemmings
Links
Master of Empire
OS/2 Chess
Rocks'n'Diamonds
Semtex
SimCity
SimCity 2000
Stellar Frontier
Super Star Trek
Trials of Battle

References

External links
OS/2 World Gaming site
Stardock - Games for OS/2 Warp (PDF)
Stardock - Cross Platform Gaming (PDF)
Stellar Frontier for OS/2 - multimedia 2D action/strategy game

OS 2